The J. C. Daniel Award is Kerala's highest award in Malayalam cinema. It is presented annually by the Kerala State Chalachitra Academy, a non-profit institution under the Department of Cultural Affairs of the Government of Kerala, India. Instituted in 1992, the award is given to honour the recipients for their "outstanding contributions to Malayalam cinema". Recipients are selected by an independent jury established by the Academy and the Department of Cultural Affairs. They are honoured at the Kerala State Film Awards ceremony.

The Government of Kerala created the award to commemorate the contribution of Indian filmmaker J. C. Daniel, who is often regarded as the "father of Malayalam cinema". The J. C. Daniel Award was managed by the Department of Cultural Affairs until 1997. In 1998, the Government of Kerala constituted the Kerala State Chalachitra Academy, and since that year, the Academy has hosted the award. In 2003, the prize money was doubled and, as part of updating it, no award was presented that year. Actor Madhu was the first recipient of the award with the increased monetary prize in 2004.

Since its inception, the J. C. Daniel Award has been bestowed on 27 individuals. The award was first presented to film distributor and producer T. E. Vasudevan in 1992. The 2011 recipient, actor Jose Prakash, died before the award ceremony. His son accepted the award on his behalf. The most recent winner is Malayalam new wave auteur K P Kumaran who was honoured on the 3rd of August 2022.

Recipients

See also
 Dadasaheb Phalke Award

Footnotes

References

External links
 Official website for Kerala State Chalachithra Academy
 Official website for Department of Cultural Affairs

Kerala State Film Awards
Malayalam cinema
Lifetime achievement awards
Lists of Indian award winners